Xplorer UltraFlight is a South African aircraft manufacturer based in Cape Town and founded by Keith Pickersgill. The company specializes in the design and manufacture of paramotors in the form of ready-to-fly aircraft for the US FAR 103 Ultralight Vehicles rules and the European Fédération Aéronautique Internationale microlight category. The company also provides paramotor flight training.

The company has produced a number of paramotor designs. In the mid-2000s these included the Xflyer and the XS, both powered by the Solo 210 engine. In 2016 the company was producing the Micro80, powered by the Italian Per Il Volo Top 80 motor and also acted as a dealer for the Spanish Marbella Parapente Paramotor PAP line.

Aircraft

References

External links

Aircraft manufacturers of South Africa
Manufacturing companies based in Cape Town
Ultralight aircraft
Paramotors
South African brands